Luka Turkulov (born 31 October 2003) is a Serbian road cyclist, who rides for Slovenian UCI Continental team . 

He won the 2022 Serbian national under-23 time trial championship and placed second in the elite road race behind Dušan Rajović. He was also the fastest at the National Championship 2022 for the best hill climber in ELITE category in Serbia BSS In 2022, he started more than 39 UCI races as one of the youngest cyclists.

Turkulov entered the world of cycling in April 2021, when he joined the Serbian national team. Before that, he did Judo and Sambo (martial art) for 11 years.

Major results
Source:
2023
 3rd National Championships Cyclocross BSS

2022
 1st  Time trial, National Under-23 Road Championships
 1st Mountain National Championships RR ELITE BSS
 National Road Championships
2nd Road race
5th Time trial 
 9th Overall Grand Prix Cycliste de Gemenc

References

External links

2003 births
Living people
Serbian male cyclists